The 1885–86 season was the 13th Scottish football season in which Dumbarton competed at a national level.

Scottish Cup

Dumbarton had an easy passage through the early rounds of the Scottish Cup before losing out to Hibernian, the East of Scotland Shield holders, in the fifth round after a 2-2 draw.

Dumbartonshire Cup

Dumbarton failed to hold on to the Dumbartonshire Cup and were defeated at the semi-final stage by Dumbarton Athletic.

Glasgow Charity Cup

It was at the semi final stage of the Glasgow Charity Cup that Dumbarton also tasted defeat, this time to rivals Vale of Leven.

Dumbartonshire Association Tournament

At the start of the season a tournament was played across the county in order to raise funds for the Dumbartonshire association.  There were 8 invitees with the first rounds being played in two groups at Alexandria on 4 August and at Helensburgh a week later, where Dumbarton were due to have met Yoker, but their opponents having failed to turn up, the Dumbarton players entertained the crowd by playing a six-a-side match.  The semi finals were played at Boghead where Dumbarton drew with Vale of Leven - the replay took place five days later.  In the final against Dumbarton Athletic on 27 August Dumbarton won 2-0.

Friendlies

Despite the growing competitive calendar, 22 'friendly' matches were played, including home and away fixtures against Rangers, Queens Park, Vale of Leven and Vale of Leven Wanderers, together with matches against Glasgow Cup holders Cambuslang, and Forfarshire Cup holders, Dundee Harp.  In addition a four match tour of the north of Scotland was undertaken during the New Year holidays.  In all, 14 were won, 5 drawn and 3 lost, scoring 72 goals and conceding 42.

Player statistics
Of note amongst those donning the club's colours for the first time was Tom McMillan.
At the same time two internationalists were lost from the club's squad:
- Robert 'Sparrow' Brown's club career spanned seven seasons, and in addition to his international caps was a member of the Scottish Cup winning side of 1882-82.
- Jock Hutcheson travelled south to join Bolton Wanderers. He served the club for over a decade, and was also a member of the cup winning squad.  He was perhaps unlucky not to earn a Scottish cap, having played in 4 international trials without success.

Only includes appearances and goals in competitive Scottish Cup matches.

Source:

International caps

An international trial match was played on 13 March 1886 to consider selection of teams to represent Scotland in the upcoming games in the 1886 British Home Championship. James McAulay played for the 'Probables' and Ralph Aitken and Joe Lindsay for the 'Improbables'. The latter won by 6-3 with Lindsay scoring a hat-trick and Aitken getting another.

Subsequently, five Dumbarton players were selected to play, as follows:

- Ralph Aitken, Michael Paton, James McAulay and Joe Lindsay earned their first, fifth, seventh and eighth caps respectively against England.

- Leitch Keir earned his second cap against Ireland.

Representative matches
Four representative matches were played during the season by the Dumbartonshire Football Association, and Dumbarton players were selected to play as follows:

In addition, the Scotland XI who played against Ireland (including Leitch Keir) subsequently played a friendly against Dundee Harp on 8 April 1886 - and lost 1-3.

References

Dumbarton F.C. seasons
Scottish football clubs 1885–86 season